659 Nestor  is a dark Jupiter trojan from the Greek camp, approximately  in diameter. It was discovered on 23 March 1908, by German astronomer Max Wolf at Heidelberg Observatory in southern Germany, and named after King Nestor from Greek mythology. The carbonaceous Jovian asteroid belongs to the 20 largest Jupiter trojans and has a rotation period of 15.98 hours.

Orbit and classification 

Nestor is a dark Jovian asteroid orbiting in the leading Greek camp at Jupiter's  Lagrangian point, 60° ahead its orbit in a 1:1 resonance (see Trojans in astronomy). It is also a non-family asteroid in the Jovian background population.

It orbits the Sun at a distance of 4.6–5.8 AU once every 11 years and 9 months (4,294 days; semi-major axis of 5.17 AU). Its orbit has an eccentricity of 0.12 and an inclination of 5° with respect to the ecliptic. As no precoveries were taken, the body's observation arc begins with its official discovery observation at Heidelberg in March 1908.

Naming 

This minor planet was named from Greek mythology after Nestor, the king of Pylos. He was an Argonaut and counselor to the Greeks at Troy. Nestor fought against the centaurs and participated in the hunt for the Calydonian Boar. The asteroid was named by the German Astronomische Gesellschaft during a meeting at Breslau in 1910.

Physical characteristics 

In the Barucci classification, Nestor is classified as a carbonaceous C-type asteroid (C0), while in the Tholen taxonomy, its spectral type is ambiguous, closest to an X-type and somewhat similar to that of a C-type (XC). In the Lightcurve Data Base it is assumed to be a primitive P-type. Its V–I color index of 0.79 is unusually low for most Jovian asteroids (typically above 0.9).

Diameter and albedo 

According to the surveys carried out by the Infrared Astronomical Satellite IRAS, the Japanese Akari satellite and the NEOWISE mission of NASA's Wide-field Infrared Survey Explorer, Nestor measures between 107.06 and 112.32 kilometers in diameter and its surface has an albedo between 0.035 and 0.040. The Collaborative Asteroid Lightcurve Link an albedo of and a diameter of kilometers based on an absolute magnitude of 8.99.

On 30 June 2006, a dimensional estimate was also obtained from an occultation event by David Gault, when the asteroid eclipsed the star "TYC 6854-00630" (as designated in the Tycho Catalogue) for a duration of 9.52 seconds. Based on this time period, a cross section with the minor and major occultation axes at  kilometers was inferred. The quality rating is 1 ("no fit").

Rotation period 

In January 1988, a first rotational lightcurve of Nestor was obtained from photometric observations by MIT-astronomer Richard P. Binzel showing a rotation period of  hours.

In August 1995, Italian astronomer Stefano Mottola observed the asteroid with the Bochum 0.61-metre Telescope at ESO's La Silla Observatory, Chile, and derived a period of  hours with a brightness variation of  magnitude.

In January and February 2014, two lightcurves in the R-band were obtained at the Palomar Transient Factory, California.

References

External links 
 Asteroid Lightcurve Database (LCDB), query form (info )
 Dictionary of Minor Planet Names, Google books
 Discovery Circumstances: Numbered Minor Planets (1)-(5000) – Minor Planet Center
 
 

000659
Discoveries by Max Wolf
Named minor planets
000659
19080323
Nestor (mythology)